Gonbar (also known as Gonbarf and Gonbarof) is a village in Gonbar Rural District of the Central District of Osku County, East Azerbaijan province, Iran. At the 2006 National Census, its population was 3,091 in 639 households. The following census in 2011 counted 3,301 people in 786 households. The latest census in 2016 showed a population of 3,460 people in 1,002 households; it was the largest village in its rural district.

Gonbar is famous for its mild summer climate. It attracts numerous tourists from nearby cities, particularly from Tabriz. The main occupation of the people is agriculture and gardening. Walnuts are a major product.

References 

Osku County

Populated places in East Azerbaijan Province

Populated places in Osku County